The 1988 Big East men's basketball tournament took place at Madison Square Garden in New York City, from March 10 to March 13, 1988. Its winner received the Big East Conference's automatic bid to the 1988 NCAA tournament. It is a single-elimination tournament with four rounds.  Pittsburgh had the best regular season conference record and received the #1 seed.

Syracuse defeated Villanova in the championship game 85–68, to claim its second Big East tournament championship.

Bracket

Game summaries

First Round

Quarterfinals

Semifinals

Championship Game

Awards
Most Valuable Player: Sherman Douglas, Syracuse

All Tournament Team
 Sherman Douglas, Syracuse
 Jerome Lane, Pittsburgh
 Mark Plansky, Villanova
 Ramón Ramos, Seton Hall
 Stephen Thompson, Syracuse
 Doug West, Villanova

External links

References

Tournament
Big East men's basketball tournament
Basketball in New York City
College sports in New York City
Sports competitions in New York City
Sports in Manhattan
Big East men's basketball tournament
Big East men's basketball tournament
1980s in Manhattan
Madison Square Garden